Linehan is a surname of Irish origin, and may refer to:

 Alfie Linehan (born 1940), Irish cricketer
 Anne Linehan (born 1973), Irish cricketer
 Brian Linehan (1943–2004), Canadian television host
 Graham Linehan (born 1968), Irish television writer and director
 John Linehan (entertainer) (born 1952), Northern Irish entertainer
 John Linehan (basketball) (born 1978), American basketball player and coach
 Kim Linehan, USA Olympic swimmer (from the 1984 Games)
 Marsha M. Linehan (born 1943), American psychologist and author
 Maxine Linehan, Irish singer and actress
 Mechele Linehan (born 1972), figure in the death of Kent Leppink
 Neil J. Linehan (1895–1967), American politician
 Peter Linehan (1943–2020), British medievalist
 Rosaleen Linehan (born 1937), veteran stage and screen actress
 Scott Linehan (born 1963), American football coach

Surnames of Irish origin